Ip Man is a series of Hong Kong martial arts films based on the life events of the Wing Chun master of the same name. The progenitor of the series was Ip Man (2008), which was followed by two sequels – Ip Man 2 (2010), Ip Man 3 (2015), the spin-off Master Z: Ip Man Legacy (2018) and the final instalment Ip Man 4: The Finale (2019). All four main films were directed by Wilson Yip, written by Edmond Wong and produced by Raymond Wong. Ip Man, Ip Man 2, Ip Man 3, and Ip Man 4: The Finale star Donnie Yen. Mandarin Films released the first two films in Hong Kong, which earned more than $37 million with a budget of around $24.6 million. Donnie Yen has mentioned each film has a unique theme, that the first Ip Man film was about "survival", Ip Man 2 focuses on "making a living and adaptation", while Ip Man 3 focuses on "life" itself.

Films

Ip Man (2008) 

Ip Man was directed by Wilson Yip and written by Edmond Wong. It was Raymond Wong's idea to develop a biographical film about Wing Chun master Ip Man. Principal photography began in Shanghai in March 2008 and ended in August. The film was released in Hong Kong on 18 December 2008 by Mandarin Films, and earned around US$21.8 million against the US$11.7 million budget. Donnie Yen portrayed the role of Ip Man in the film, set in the 1930s, focuses on events in Ip's life in the city of Foshan during the Sino-Japanese War.

Ip Man 2 (2010) 

The sequel is set in 1949, when Ip Man moved to Hong Kong and attempts to promote Wing Chun in the region. It was intended to focus on the relationship between Ip Man and his most famed disciple Bruce Lee. The film was directed by Yip and written by Edmond Wong, while Raymond Wong produced the film and was released in Hong Kong on 29 April 2010 by Mandarin Films. The film grossed more than $50 million against the budget of $12.9 million.

Ip Man 3 (2015) 

Principal photography began in Shanghai on 25 March 2015, which Yip is again directing the film based on the script by Wong. Donnie Yen is again portraying the role of Ip Man, along with him Mike Tyson is also playing a role of a street fighter. Bruce Lee's character was initially supposed to be featured in CGI, because the producers could not find an actor who could portray Lee convincingly, but Danny Chan was eventually cast in the role.

Principal photography for Ip Man 3 began on 25 March 2015, and the film was released in Hong Kong on 24 December 2015.

Master Z: Ip Man Legacy (2018) 

Max Zhang reprises his role as Cheung Tin Chi from Ip Man 3 in this spin-off film. Directed by Yuen Woo-ping, it also stars Tony Jaa, Dave Bautista and Michelle Yeoh.

Ip Man 4: The Finale (2019) 

On 30 September 2016, Yen announced via Facebook that he and Wilson Yip would continue the franchise with Ip Man 4. The film began production in April 2018 and ended in July of the same year. It was released on 20 December 2019, and portrays Ip Man traveling to San Francisco to secure a spot for his son at a local school. Meanwhile, he crosses paths with his student, Bruce Lee, who had set up a Wing Chun school there.

Untitled Master Z: Ip Man Legacy sequel 
In April 2019, it was reported that Max Zhang is set to reprise his role in a sequel to Master Z: Ip Man Legacy. The sequel is reported to be taking a budget cut, down to $13 million, from the first film's budget of $28 million.

Recurring cast and characters

Reception

Box office

Critical response

Home media 
Ip Man Trilogy, a Blu-ray compilation that features the first three films in the series, was released by Well Go USA in November 2016. The Blu-ray also includes special features such as deleted scenes, "behind-the-scenes" featurette and interviews with Donnie Yen and Mike Tyson.

See also 
 The Grandmaster
 Ip Man: The Final Fight
 The Legend Is Born: Ip Man

References 

Cantonese-language films
Action film series
Depictions of Ip Man on film
Film series introduced in 2008
2000s martial arts films
2000s Hong Kong films